The National Pensioners Convention (NPC) is the principal organisation representing pensioners in the United Kingdom. It is made up of around hundreds of bodies representing 1.15 million members, organised into federal regional units.

The NPC was founded by former Transport and General Workers' Union trade union leader, Jack Jones in 1979.  He served as its President until 2001, when he was succeeded by Rodney Bickerstaffe, who had been general secretary of UNISON. Frank Cooper was the next President, followed by Ron Douglas and then Rosie MacGregor.

Bev Morrison is the National Public Affairs Manager.
Jonathan Safir is the National Administration & Information Manager.
Mohammad Jameer is the Finance Officer.

Presidents
1979: Jack Jones
2001: Rodney Bickerstaffe
2005: Frank Cooper
2013: Ron Douglas
2022: Rosie MacGregor

References

External links 
Official site
Catalogue of Rodney Bickerstaffe's papers concerning the NPC, held at the Modern Records Centre, University of Warwick

Charities for the elderly based in the United Kingdom
Organizations established in 1979
Political advocacy groups in the United Kingdom
Seniors' organizations